Slednecks is an American reality television series about a group of friends living in Wasilla, Alaska that premiered on MTV on October 30, 2014. The show's title is borrowed from a slang term referring to "rednecks" who live in snowy climes, like Alaska. The series has the same basic premise as Buckwild, the popular show that preceded Slednecks on Thursday nights (but was canceled after one of its cast members died). Slednecks was cancelled after one season due to low ratings.

Premise
Slednecks is a documentary series that follows a group of friends living in the "modern-day Wild Wild West of Alaska".

Cast

Main

 Jackie – "Inupiat Eskimo from Kotzebue"
 Hali – "Straight Shooter"
 Big Mike – "Pure Bred Alaskan"
 Dylan – "El Tornado"
 Tosca – "The Tomboy"
 Zeke – "Adrenaline Junkie"
 Amber – "Big City"
 Kelly – "The On again Off again"
 Samantha – "The Youngster"
 Sierra – "Sassy and Outspoken"
 Trevor – "Fungineer"

Recurring

 Leonard – "The Boss"
 Jack – "Jackie's Dad"

Development
When it was announced on April 9, 2013, that MTV had chosen to cancel Buckwild, it was reported that executive producer J.P. Williams from Parallel Entertainment stated that his company would like to revive the series in another location with a new cast.

Production
On April 24, 2014, Slednecks was announced. According to MTV President Stephen Friedman, the series set in Alaska "will not be a version of 'Buckwild' in a different setting", but like Jersey Shore and Laguna Beach: The Real Orange County will "be focused on the unusual experiences of a different group of people".

On December 30, 2014 the cast announced via Twitter that the show had been canceled.

Episodes
The first (and only) season aired episode in pairs, back to back. The series' special 90-minute premiere aired on October 30, 2014, but was released a week earlier on October 23, 2014 for the MTV app as well as the Xbox One app and Xbox 360 for Xbox Live members living in the United States.

Ratings

References

General references 
 
 
 
 

MTV reality television series
2010s American reality television series
2014 American television series debuts
2014 American television series endings
Television shows set in Alaska